The Garden Point Cemetery is a historic cemetery on Arkansas Highway 140 in southern Etowah, Arkansas.  It is the city's oldest cemetery, and where many of its earliest citizens are buried.  The cemetery occupies a ridge of land south of the city center, which is one of the highest areas overlooking the Mississippi River plains.  Although the oldest known graves date to 1890, the oldest marked grave is dated 1903, and is for Reddrick Henry Jackson, one of Etowah's founders.  The cemetery, now owned by the city, has more than 2000 burials.

The cemetery was listed on the National Register of Historic Places in 2006.

See also
 National Register of Historic Places listings in Mississippi County, Arkansas

References

External links
 

Cemeteries on the National Register of Historic Places in Arkansas
1890 establishments in Arkansas
National Register of Historic Places in Mississippi County, Arkansas
Buildings and structures completed in 1890
Cemeteries established in the 1890s